"This Is the Day" is a 1983 song by The The.

This Is the Day may also refer to:

 This Is the Day (album), by Christy Moore, 2001
 This Is the Day, a 2010 album by Ezio
 "This Is the Day", an anthem by John Rutter commissioned for the Royal Wedding in 2011
 This Is the Day, a 2012 album by the Cambridge Singers with Aurora Orchestra
 "This Is the Day" (Ivy song), 1998
 "This Is the Day", a song by the Cranberries from the album Wake Up and Smell the Coffee, 2001
 "This Is the day", a song by Captain Beefheart on the album Unconditionally Guaranteed, 1974

See also
 This is the day which the Lord hath made (disambiguation)
 This Is the Day...This Is the Hour...This Is This!, a 1989 album by Pop Will Eat Itself